Marc Beaudoin (born 1935 died 2012) is a judge and former politician in the Canadian province of Quebec. He served on the Montreal City Council from 1978 to 1986 as a member of mayor Jean Drapeau's Civic Party and was a member of the Montreal executive committee (i.e., the municipal cabinet). In 1991, he was appointed as a judge on the Quebec Superior Court.

Private career
Beaudoin was a lawyer in private life. A Montreal Gazette report indicates that he was fifty years old in 1986.

Councillor
Beaudoin was first elected to the Montreal city council in the 1978 municipal election and was re-elected in 1982. He served as vice-president of the Montreal executive committee for a time and was chair of council from 1982 to 1986. In May 1986, Beaudoin presided over the first Montreal city council meeting in which journalists were allowed to bring cameras and recording equipment into the chambers.

When Drapeau announced his retirement in 1986, Beaudoin supported Claude Dupras's successful bid to become the Civic Party's new leader and mayoral candidate. Dupras was defeated by Montreal Citizens' Movement candidate Jean Doré in the general election, while Beaudoin was defeated in Gabriel-Sagard by MCM candidate Vittorio Capparelli.

Beaudoin became the Civic Party's vice-president after the election. He resigned from the party executive in February 1989, saying that the party's attempts at democratization "[had] not achieved the desired results."

Federal politics
Beaudoin was a supporter of the Progressive Conservative Party of Canada at the federal level. He was chosen as president of the party's Rosemont association in August 1988, with support from the party establishment. Rosemont's Member of Parliament (MP) at the time was Suzanne Blais-Grenier, who questioned the legitimacy of Beaudoin's election and suggested that it was part of an effort to pressure her into resigning. Her supporters set up a rival association with a different president, and a quarrel ensued as to which group controlled the local party finances.

Blais-Grenier was ultimately kicked out of the Progressive Conservative party, and Beaudoin's association was recognized as official. Shortly thereafter, Beaudoin resigned as president to become the Progressive Conservative candidate for Saint-Léonard in the 1988 federal election. This contest was expected to be close, but it was not; Beaudoin finished a fairly distant second against Liberal incumbent Alfonso Gagliano.

Judge
In December 1991, Canadian federal justice minister Kim Campbell appointed Beaudoin as a judge on the Quebec Superior Court.
Notable rulings
Beaudoin ruled in July 1993 that the last remaining English-language school overseen by the Montreal Catholic School Commission in Côte-des-Neiges could be redesignated as a French-language school. Several parents of anglophone children argued that the commission made its decision without proper consultation; Beaudoin concluded that the parents did not prove their case.

In 1997, Beaudoin dismissed a lawsuit from a Quebec resident who had sued McDonald's for $33,864 after suffering second-degree burns from spilled coffee. The litigant was seated in a car that was not moving at the time of the incident, and Beaudoin ruled that only the Quebec automobile-insurance board (rather than the company) could be held liable for "damage caused by an automobile." The Quebec Court of Appeal later overturned Beaudoin's decision, concluding that there was no link between the litigant's injuries and the use or ownership of a car.

Beaudoin reviewed a class-action lawsuit by former Jonquière Wal-Mart employees in 2005, following the company's decision to close their Jonquière branch after a successful unionization drive by the employees. Wal-Mart claimed that the store was not sufficiently profitable, while opponents argued the company's decision was intended to intimidate workers in other branches. Beaudoin ultimately ruled that the lawsuit could not proceed, on the grounds that the dispute with Wal-Mart was the exclusive jurisdiction of the Quebec labour board. The former employees announced they would appeal the decision.

Electoral record

References

2012 deaths
Montreal city councillors
Judges in Quebec
Quebec candidates for Member of Parliament
Progressive Conservative Party of Canada candidates for the Canadian House of Commons
Candidates in the 1988 Canadian federal election
1935 births